Karakol Peak is a mountain in the Terskey Ala-too of the Tian Shan. It is located in the Issyk-Kul Region in east Kyrgyzstan.

History
It was first climbed in 1937 by N. Popov, G. Beloglazov, V. Ratsek, and K. Baygazinov.

References

Mountains of Kyrgyzstan
Five-thousanders of the Tian Shan
Issyk-Kul Region